Plácido Bilbao Zubiaur (13 September 1940 – 16 June 2014) was a Spanish professional footballer who played as a striker.

Career
Born in Lamiaco, Bilbao played for Indautxu, Athletic Bilbao, Real Valladolid, Recreativo de Huelva, Arenas Club, the Boston Beacons, Estepona and Melilla.

References

1940 births
2014 deaths
Spanish footballers
SD Indautxu footballers
Athletic Bilbao footballers
Real Valladolid players
Recreativo de Huelva players
Arenas Club de Getxo footballers
North American Soccer League (1968–1984) players
Boston Beacons players
UD Melilla footballers
La Liga players
Segunda División players
Spanish expatriate footballers
Spanish expatriate sportspeople in the United States
Expatriate soccer players in the United States
Association football forwards